Galeruca pomonae is a small species of leaf beetle native to Europe that has been reported feeding on rosettes of Dipsacus.

References

Galerucinae
Beetles of Europe
Taxa named by Giovanni Antonio Scopoli
Beetles described in 1763